Archbishop Jules Mikhael Al-Jamil (November 18, 1938 – December 3, 2012) was the Syriac Catholic titular archbishop of Tagritum and the auxiliary bishop.

Life
He was born in Bakhdida and joined the nearby Mar Behnam Monastery at a young age. After ordination to priesthood in 1969 he moved to Lebanon where he spend several years in the Charafet monastery, the seat of the Syriac Catholic Church.

He was ordained honorary archbishop of Tikrit in 1986 and later spent several years in Europe where he received his doctorate from the Pontifical Lateran University in Rome for his thesis on Christian communities under Islamic rule.

He died of a stroke in Rome on December 3, 2012, and was buried in his birthplace in Iraq.

References

1938 births
2012 deaths
People from Bakhdida
Pontifical Lateran University alumni
Iraqi Eastern Catholics
Syriac Catholic bishops
20th-century Eastern Catholic bishops
21st-century Eastern Catholic archbishops